Rogassa is a municipality in province of El Bayadh, Algeria. It is the district seat of the district of Rogassa and has a population of 5.598, which gives it 7 seats in the PMA. Its postal code is 32240 and its municipal code is 3202.

Communes of El Bayadh Province
Cities in Algeria
Algeria